The 1976 Portland Timbers season was the second season for the Portland Timbers in the now-defunct North American Soccer League.

Squad 
The 1976 squad

North American Soccer League

Pacific Conference, Western Division standings 

Pld = Matches played; W = Matches won; L = Matches lost; GF = Goals for; GA = Goals against; GD = Goal difference; Pts = PointsSource:

League results 

* = Won coin-flipSource:

References

1976
American soccer clubs 1976 season
1976 in sports in Oregon
Portland
1976 in Portland, Oregon